Pinkenba Wharf is an Australian wharf, located within the Port of Brisbane, Queensland, Australia. It is located adjacent to the former Pinkenba railway station.

History
The railway was extended from Ascot railway station to Pinkenba in 1897 and the wharf was built in 1898. In 1902 a railway spur was built to service the wharf directly.

Present use
The larger ocean-going cruise ships that visit the port currently dock at the Pinkenba Wharf, located on the north side of the Brisbane River, north of the Gateway Bridge, due to height restrictions placed by the bridge.

Until the establishment of the new Portside Wharf at Hamilton, Australian cruise ship company P&O Cruises used the Pinkenba wharf as a base for its cruise ships, "Pacific Sky" and "Pacific Star". The Brisbane dock is not particularly glamorous, and is mainly used by industrial vessels.

Correspondingly the Queensland Government is under pressure to create a new second international cruise terminal for Brisbane on the northern side of the Gateway Bridge to accommodate the larger ocean-going cruise ships. A February 2008 visit by the luxury cruise ship the MS Queen Victoria meant that passengers could not use the international standard cruise terminal facilities at Portside Wharf and had to use the industrial wharf complex at Pinkenba instead.

References

Buildings and structures in Brisbane
Transport in Brisbane